The Clifton T. Perkins Hospital Center (CTPHC) is a 250-bed psychiatric hospital in Jessup, Maryland.

Function 
Clifton T. Perkins Hospital Center is classified as a "Mental Hygiene Administration facility within the Department of Health and Mental Hygiene." The facility is also known as "Maryland’s maximum security forensic psychiatric hospital." Nearly all of its patients are involved in the legal system in some manner.  CTPHC receives, evaluates, and treats several different groups of patients, including individuals who require psychiatric evaluation because they have been accused of a felony and have raised the Not Criminally Responsible (NCR) defense and/or their Competency to Stand Trial is in question. CTPHC also provides treatment to accused offenders who have been adjudicated NCR and/or Incompetent to Stand Trial (IST) and accepts inmates from fellow correctional and psychiatric facilities who meet the criteria for involuntary commitment (IVA), or whose behavior is violent or aggressive.

History 
The hospital was created by an act of the Maryland General Assembly on May 5, 1959, and construction commenced soon after. The facility is named for Dr. Clifton T. Perkins, a psychiatrist and former head of the Maryland Department of Health and Mental Hygiene.

Location 
As of the 2010 census, the center of population for the State of Maryland falls in the hospital's northern parking lot.

Notable patients
Reginald Oates (born 1950), American spree killer

In popular culture
 Clifton T. Perkins is mentioned in The Wire as the likely destination of the business card killer.

References

External links
 Official site

Jessup, Maryland
Buildings and structures in Howard County, Maryland
Psychiatric hospitals in Maryland